Wacuś is a 1935 Polish romantic comedy film directed by Michał Waszyński.

Cast
Adolf Dymsza...  Tadeusz Rosolek, alias Wacus Rosolek 
Jadwiga Andrzejewska ...  Kazia Wolska 
Mieczysława Ćwiklińska ...  The Widow Centkowska 
Władysław Grabowski ...  Dr. Lecki 
Maria Korska ...  Mother Wolska 
Józef Orwid ...  Pawnshop Owner 
Eugeniusz Koszutski ...  Antoni, pawnshop guard 
Jerzy Marr ...  Roman 'Franek' Suzinik, cousin 
Klemens Mielczarek ...  Kubuś, teenage boarder 
Michał Halicz ...  Gypsy on Horseback 
Jerzy Kobusz ...  Pietrusiński, football goalie
Irena Skwierczyńska ...  Gypsy Wife 
Konrad Tom ...  Cosmeticians' School Director 
Leon Rechenski ...  School Watchman 
Feliks Chmurkowski ...  The Schoolteacher

External links 
 

1935 films
1930s Polish-language films
Polish black-and-white films
Films directed by Michał Waszyński
1935 romantic comedy films
Polish romantic comedy films